Simon Gionet is a French Canadian film director. He is most noted for his short film Cayenne (2020), which was a Canadian Screen Award nominee for Best Live Action Short Drama at the 9th Canadian Screen Awards.

Biography 
Simon Gionet was born in Quebec City. He is a graduate of Mel Hoppenheim School of Cinema and co-founder of Littoral Films, a production company focused towards fiction filmmaking.

He currently lives in Montreal.

References

External links 

 

Film directors from Quebec
Living people
Year of birth missing (living people)